Terry Leahy (12 October 1946 – 29 November 2002) was an Australian rules footballer who played for Melbourne and South Melbourne in the VFL. His brothers John and Brian also played with Melbourne.

Australian rules football career
On Monday, 25 April 1966, Terry Leahy made his VFL debut in Melbourne's Round 1 loss to St Kilda at the MCG. He continued to play all of Melbourne's 18 games for the year, kicking a total of six goals and earning one Brownlow Medal vote. Leahy also won the Keith 'Bluey' Truscott Medal for being voted Melbourne's best and fairest during the 1966 season.

During the 1967 season Leahy only played eight games, kicking two goals in the process – one against Geelong in Round 2, the other during the Round 16 win against Footscray. Melbourne "dismissed" Leahy at the end of the 1967 season as a "disciplinary measure".

Leahy subsequently moved to South Melbourne for the 1968 season, where he remained until the end of his VFL career in 1970. In the 1968 season he played twelve games, kicked four goals and earned one Brownlow Medal vote. The following season he played 19 of South Melbourne's 20 games, kicking three goals and earning two Brownlow votes. In his final season he kicked two goals in the eight games played and did not play again after South Melbourne's Round 13 win over North Melbourne.

Playing statistics

|- style="background-color: #EAEAEA"
! scope="row" style="text-align:center" | 1966
|style="text-align:center;"|
| 19 || 18 || 6 || 13 || 250 || 30 || 280 || 38 || || 0.3 || 0.7 || 13.9 || 1.7 || 15.6 || 2.1 || 
|-
! scope="row" style="text-align:center" | 1967
|style="text-align:center;"|
| 19 || 8 || 2 || 1 || 68 || 9 || 77 || 9 ||  || 0.3 || 0.1 || 8.5 || 1.1 || 9.6 || 1.1 || 
|- style="background-color: #EAEAEA"
! scope="row" style="text-align:center" | 1968
|style="text-align:center;"|
| 19 || 12 || 4 || 8 || 158 || 25 || 183 || 29 ||  || 0.3 || 0.7 || 13.2 || 2.1 || 15.3 || 2.4 || 
|-
! scope="row" style="text-align:center" | 1969
|style="text-align:center;"|
| 19 || 19 || 3 || 8 || 279 || 87 || 366 || 44 ||  || 0.2 || 0.4 || 14.7 || 4.6 || 19.3 || 2.3 || 
|- style="background-color: #EAEAEA"
! scope="row" style="text-align:center" | 1970
|style="text-align:center;"|
| 19 || 8 || 2 || 0 || 53 || 16 || 69 || 9 ||  || 0.3 || 0.0 || 6.6 || 2.0 || 8.6 || 1.1 || 
|- class="sortbottom"
! colspan=3| Career
! 65
! 17
! 30
! 808
! 167
! 975
! 129
! 
! 0.3
! 0.5
! 12.4
! 2.6
! 15.0
! 2.0
! 
|}

See also 
List of Australian rules football families

References

External links

1946 births
2002 deaths
Melbourne Football Club players
Sydney Swans players
Keith 'Bluey' Truscott Trophy winners
Australian rules footballers from New South Wales